Dichomeris caryoplecta is a moth in the family Gelechiidae. It was described by Edward Meyrick in 1930. It is found in Pará, Brazil.

The forewings are iron grey, the costa suffused with darker and the dorsal half tinged with bluish or brownish. There is an oblique brown streak from the dorsum at one-fourth, reaching rather more than halfway across the wing. There is also a dark fuscous rhomboidal blotch occupying the dorsal half of the wing from three-fifths to the termen, the anterior half of the upper edge formed by a thick chestnut-brown streak. The apical and terminal edge are black, slightly edged whitish internally. The hindwings are grey.

References

Moths described in 1930
caryoplecta